Quebec Route 191 is a provincial highway in the Canadian province of Quebec. This route provides a link connecting Quebec Autoroute 20 and Quebec Autoroute 85 from Rivière-du-Loup and Cacouna and a direct link for areas east of Rivière-du-Loup towards the southern part of the Bas-Saint-Laurent region, New Brunswick and Maine.

Towns along Route 191

 Rivière-du-Loup
 Cacouna

References

External links
 Transport Quebec Road Conditions Map
 Interactive Provincial Route Map (Transports Québec)
 2008 Construction projects in the Bas-Saint-Laurent

191
Roads in Bas-Saint-Laurent
Transport in Rivière-du-Loup